Ken Leslie Goodwin MA Dip.Ed. (Syd.), DPhil. (Oxon), Hon D.Litt. (USQ),(29 September 1934 – 12 July 2014) was an Australian academic and author.

Ken Goodwin was the first of his family to attend university. After obtaining a BA Hons. and a Dip. Ed. from
the University of Sydney he taught at a New South Wales high school and Wagga Wagga Teachers' College. In 1959 he accepted a position as a lecturer in English in the Department of External Studies at The University of Queensland.

In the 1997 Australia Day Honours Goodwin was made an Member of the Order of Australia in recognition of his service to literature, art administration and education.

Publications 
His publications include:

 A history of Australian literature London : Macmillan, 1986.

References

1934 births
2014 deaths
Australian literature
Members of the Order of Australia